Henry Tobias Frere (27 September 1830 – 15 August 1881) was an English first-class cricketer. Frere was a right-handed batsman who bowled right-arm roundarm fast and who played occasionally as a wicket-keeper.

Frere made his first-class debut for Hampshire against an All-England Eleven in 1850. Frere played a number of non first-class matches forHampshire and numerous other sides from 1850 to 1863. In 1855 Frere made his second first-class appearance, this time for the Gentlemen of England against the Marylebone Cricket Club.

Three years later Frere made played two matches for the Gentlemen, the first of which came in the 1858 Gentlemen v Players fixture and the second of which came for the Gentlemen of the South against the Gentlemen of the North. The following season Frere played in the same two fixtures once again.

In 1863 Frere played for Hampshire County Cricket Club in the year of their founding in two non first-class matches against Surrey. In 1864 Frere made his first-class debut for the county club against Sussex. Despite keeping wicket in the match, Frere took 2/20 from twenty overs. From 1864 to 1868, Frere played six first-class matches for Hampshire with his final first-class match for the county coming in 1866 against the Marylebone Cricket Club. In his six matches for the county, Frere scored 92 runs at a batting average of 10.22, with a high score of 23. With the ball Frere took 6 wickets at a bowling average of 41.33, with best figures of 2/20. Behind the stumps Frere took five catches and made two stumpings.

In 1868 Frere made his final first-class appearance, representing Sussex in a single first-class match against Middlesex.

In Frere's overall first-class career he scored 177 runs at a batting average of 9.83, with a high score of 26. With the ball Frere took 24 wickets at a bowling average of 26.95, with one five wicket haul for the Gentlemen of the South against the Gentlemen of the North in 1859 which yielded him career best figures of 5–20.

Frere died at Westbourne, Hampshire on 15 August 1881.

External links
Henry Frere at Cricinfo
Henry Frere at CricketArchive
Matches and detailed statistics for Henry Frere

1830 births
1881 deaths
People from Odiham
English cricketers
Hampshire cricketers
Gentlemen cricketers
Sussex cricketers
Gentlemen of the South cricketers
Gentlemen of England cricketers
Henry Tobias